Choondal  is a village in Thrissur district in the state of Kerala, India.

Demographics
 India census, Choondal had a population of 11719 with 5478 males and 6241 females.
Choondal is about 20 kilometers away from Thrissur, where you can see a panoramic view of green grass fields. This place is
known in Thrissur District for its educational Institutions, hospitals and places of worship. Paddy, coconut and Areca nut 
are the major produces of this village.
From This junction we turn to Guruvayoor which is about 8 km away from Choondal
The Catholics of this area comes under the parish of Nativity of Our Lady church Puthuessery.

Temples in Choondal
Melekavu temple
Parappuram Mahavishnu Temple
Payyurkkavu Sree Durga Bhagavathi Temple
Thayamkkavu Sri Ayyappa Temple
Parappur Sri Devi temple
Payyur Subramanya Swami Temple

References

Villages in Thrissur district